Zimbabwe has an active film culture that includes films made in Zimbabwe during its pre- and post-colonial periods. Economic crisis and political crisis have been features of the industry. A publication from the 1980s counted 14 cinemas in Zimbabwe's capital city, Harare. According to a 1998 report only 15 percent of the population had been to a cinema. European and American films have been made on location in Zimbabwe as well as Indian films. American films are popular in Zimbabwe but face restrictions limiting their distribution.

History
Great Britain's Colonial Film Unit was active in Zimbabwe. Zimbabwe's post-colonial government has worked to sponsor film development. Germany helped fund a film training and production program.

Festivals
The Zimbabwe Film Festival

Zimbabwean directors include Tsitsi Dangarembga, Rumbi Katedza, Roger Hawkins (film director), Godwin Mawuru, Michael Raeburn, Farai Sevenzo, Ingrid Sinclair, Sydney Taivavashe, and Edwina Spicer.

Zimbabwean actors include: Munya Chidzonga, Tongayi Chirisa, Adam Croasdell, John Indi, Dominic Kanaventi, Edgar Langeveldt, Tawanda Manyimo, l Cont Mhlanga and Lucian Msamati. Zimbabwean actresses include Chipo Chung, Carole Gray, Kubi Indi, and Sibongile Mlambo.

Several films cover the Rhodesian Bush War.

Zimbabwe hosts the International Images Film Festival for Women and Zimbabwe International Film Festival.

Keith Shiri is a Zimbabwean film curator.

Films
Films from Rhodesia
Shangani Patrol (film) (1968)

Films from Zimbabwe include:

Albino (film) (1976), a German thriller
King Solomon's Mines (1985 film), an action adventure film shot in Zimbabwe
Kizhakku Africavil Sheela (1987), a Tamil language film largely shot in Zimbabwe
A World Apart (film) (1988), the film addresses apartheid
Jit (film) (1990)
White Hunter Black Heart, an American film shot in Zimbabwe
Neria (1993)Everyone's Child (1995)Flame (1996 film) set during the Rhodesian Bush WarFlame (1996 film)Forbidden Fruit (2000 film)The Legend of the Sky Kingdom (2003), an animated filmTanyaradzwa (2005)Mugabe and the White African (2009), a documentaryiThemba (2010), a documentary about a bandSomething Nice from London (2013)Democrats (film), a Danish documentary about politics in ZimbabweGonarezhou (film) 2019, an anti-poaching film

The film Lumumba (film)'' was filmed in Zimbabwe.

References